Shridhar Chillal (born 29 January 1937) is an Indian man from the city of Pune, who held the world record for the longest fingernails ever reached on a single hand, with a combined length of 909.6 centimeters (358.1 inches). Chillal's longest single nail is his thumbnail, measuring 197.8 centimeters (77.87 inches). He stopped cutting his nails in 1952.

Although proud of his record-breaking nails, Chillal has faced increasing difficulties due to the weight of his finger nails, including disfigurement of his fingers and loss of function in his left hand. He claims that nerve damage to his left arm from the nails' immense weight has also caused deafness in his left ear.

Chillal has appeared in films and television displaying his nails, such as Jackass 2.5.

On 11 July 2018, Chillal had his fingernails cut with a power tool at the Ripley's Believe It or Not! museum in New York City, where the nails will be put on display. A technician wearing protective gear cut the nails during a "nail clipping ceremony".

See also
 Lee Redmond, who held the record for the longest fingernails on both hands.

References

External links
Shridhar Chillal on IMDB

1937 births
Living people
People from Pune
World record holders
Biological records
20th-century Indian photographers